Luc Michel (born 1958) is a Belgian political activist. He is the current leader and founder of the Parti Communautaire National-Européen (PCN). According to research by the BBC and Logically he is also the chief responsible person for a big francophone African social network and fake news network spreading pro-Russian and anti-Western propaganda.

Life
Luc Michel is from Charleroi. In his youth Michel was a member of Front de la Jeunesse, a private militia group on the extreme right. However he first came to prominence when he served as Thiriart's personal secretary. Inspired by the success of Jean-Marie LePen in France, Michel attempted to establish a group using the National Front name in 1984, but this proved unsuccessful. A more long-lasting Belgian National Front was established by Daniel Féret the following year, although Michel took no role in this group due to a strong personal antipathy towards Féret.

He established the PCN in 1984, following the failure of his National Front initiative. Michel has been leader since foundation, although following the collapse of the Soviet Union he convinced his mentor Thiriart to become a member. Thiriart died soon afterwards however.

In 2014, Michel and Jean-Pierre Vandersmissen, as representatives of a group called the Eurasian Observatory for Democracy and Elections, acted as observers of the Crimean status referendum.

Ideology
Michel is a supporter of National Bolshevism and has described himself as a "national communist". He has created a number of peridocials that stress opposition to Zionism and the United States. He is a lawyer by profession, he has also written extensively on his political ideas. He has claimed to have the support of Gennady Zyuganov, leader of the Communist Party of the Russian Federation, in this endeavour.

In his writing Michel has expressed admiration for several developing world figures, including Che Guevara, Juan Peron, Saddam Hussein and Muammar Gaddafi. His attraction to the latter led him to establish the Mouvement Européen pour la Démocratie Directe, a think tank inspired by the Third International Theory. Michel established contact with the Libyan regime and in August 2003 organised with their help the quatrieme universite d'ete pour les mouvements verts, pacifistes et alternatifs en Europe as an attempt to encourage co-operation between elements of the far right and the far left.

Publications
Le Parti Historique Révolutionnaire
Orientations NR
Manifeste à la Nation-Europe
Pour une Europe unitaire et communautaire
Mythes et réalités du national-bolchévisme (Russie, Allemagne, Europe)
La résistance allemande anti-hitlérienne
Moammar Kadhafi et la révolution lybienne

References

External links
 Luc Michel - official website

1958 births
Belgian politicians
Living people
National Bolsheviks